is a sub-group of the Japanese idol girl group Nakano Fujo Sisters and was formed in 2007 by Imperial Records. Fudanjuku is Nakano Fujo Sisters' alter-ego boy band, in which the members take on male personas and dress. Fudanjuku released their debut single "Otokozuka" in 2008 and later stopped performing as Nakano Fujo Sisters in 2011 to focus on Fudanjuku full-time.

History 

In 2006, the Nakano Fujoshi Sisters were formed as a comic performance troupe, consisting of gravure models and actresses who considered themselves otaku and fujoshi. In 2010, they renamed themselves Nakano Fujo Sisters and began releasing original music. While performing multiple live shows under the name Nakano Fujo Sisters, the group formed a male-alter ego for themselves, Fudanjuku, to make performances more interesting. The group released their debut single in 2008. 

After November 25, 2011, the activities of the group Nakano Fujo Sisters were placed on hiatus. Fudanjuku, however, continues to perform and release new works.

Subgroups

Fudanjuku

 is an "alter ego" male idol group of Nakano Fujo Sisters.

W Prince

With the graduation of Seimyouji Uramasa and Akazono Kojiro, the remaining two senior members formed a duo-idol group in 2017 titled W♠PRINCE.

Members 

The members use their real names as Nakano Fujo Sisters and their male stage names when performing as Fudanjuku.

  / 
  / 
  / 
  / 
  /

Former members 

  / 
  / 
  / 
  / 
  / 
  / 
  / 
  / 
  / 
  / 
  / 
  /  
  / 
  /

Timeline

Discography

Singles

Studio albums

Concert DVD

Other media

Manga

In 2011, Arina Tanemura, who is friends with the members of Fudanjuku, wrote and illustrated , a manga adaptation featuring fictional portrayals of their male alter-egos. The comic ran for seven chapters in Margaret. Tanemura had drawn the comic after Fudanjuku had expressed interest in cosplaying as her characters. A vomic (voice comic) adaptation covering the first chapter was released in four parts on a weekly basis in 2012, with the members of Fudanjuku providing the voices to the characters.

References

External links 
 
 中野風女シスターズオフィシャルブログ「Fuログ」
 Fudanjuku (風男塾) profile at Teichiku Entertainment
  Fudanjuku (腐男塾) profile at Teichiku Entertainment

Musical groups established in 2006
Musical groups established in 2008
2006 establishments in Japan
2008 establishments in Japan
Japanese girl groups
Japanese idol groups